Vebjørn Hagen (born 29 January 1978) is a retired Norwegian football defender.

He grew up in the club FK Bodø/Glimt, and represented Norway as a youth international. In 1998 he made his Eliteserien debut for the senior team. Playing only cup games in 1999, he was loaned out to Skjetten SK. The move was made permanent to the second-tier club, which also used the moniker Romerike Fotball. In 2003 and 2004 he got two seasons in Fredrikstad FK, helping them win promotion from the 2003 1. divisjon and play in the 2004 Eliteserien. He continued his career in the lower tiers with Sarpsborg FK, Bror av Fredrikstad and Trosvik.

References

1978 births
Living people
Sportspeople from Bodø
Norwegian footballers
Norway youth international footballers
FK Bodø/Glimt players
Skjetten SK players
Fredrikstad FK players
Sarpsborg FK players
Eliteserien players
Norwegian First Division players
Association football defenders